Glen Innes Airport  is a small airport located  northwest of Glen Innes, New South Wales, Australia.

Unusually for a small town airport the runway is sealed and of a reasonable length ( plus), this runway was constructed around the Second World War as a possible northern base for the Brisbane Line in the case of Japanese invasion. The airport is going under a major development with Glen Innes Regional Airport Pty Ltd committed to the construction of a 600-student resident commercial aviation college. The school will prepare both Australian and international students to graduate "airline ready" with full CASA licenses, up to Multi Engine crew and instrument rating. Plans for the college include classrooms, operations facilities, serviced accommodations, recreation facilities, and simulation bays. The airport is connected to town water sewerage and water.
A second runway will be sealed to 1,200m and parallel sealed taxiways will be constructed in addition to new hardstands for up to 40 aircraft and hangars and fueling facilities for Jet A1 and Avgas.
Glen Innes experiences excellent weather conditions for flying more than 350 days per year.

See also
List of airports in New South Wales

References

Airports in New South Wales